The Mahican-Mohawk Trail is a long-distance hiking trail that is under construction.

Originally a trail used by Native Americans, the Mahican-Mohawk Trail faded away as the automobile became popular and subsequently, the Mohawk Trail was constructed.  In 1992, after some research by Williams College students, volunteers started to reclaim the trail.

There are currently multiple sections open in western Massachusetts, including one that follows the old New York, New Haven and Hartford Railroad grade. It is estimated that  of trail are currently open. A large portion of the open trail is located in Mohawk Trail State Forest and South River State Forest.

Upon completion, the trail is projected to reach from the Connecticut River to the Hudson River.

References

External links
Mahican-Mohawk Trail Department of Conservation and Recreation 
Mahican-Mohawk Trail Map: Bardwells Ferry Bridge Department of Conservation and Recreation 
Mahican-Mohawk Trail Map: Mohawk Trail State Forest Department of Conservation and Recreation 
Mahican-Mohawk Trail Map: Savoy Campground to Route 2, Drury Department of Conservation and Recreation 
Mahican-Mohawk Trail Map: Spruce Hill to Savoy Campground Department of Conservation and Recreation 
Mahican-Mohawk Trail Map: Western Summit to Spruce Hill Department of Conservation and Recreation 

Hiking trails in Massachusetts
Protected areas of Berkshire County, Massachusetts
Protected areas of Franklin County, Massachusetts